2014 Copa Argentina Final was the 257th and final match of the 2013–14 Copa Argentina. It was played on November 26, 2014, at the Estadio del Bicentenario between Rosario Central and Huracán. Huracán won the tournament beating Rosario Central on penalties to win their first Copa Argentina title. 

By winning the competition, Huracán won the right to play the 2015 Copa Libertadores, and the 2014 Supercopa Argentina.

Qualified teams

Road to the final

Match

Details

Statistics

References

2013–14 in Argentine football
2014
2013–14 domestic association football cups
a
a
Association football penalty shoot-outs